Len Krisak (born July 30, 1948) is an American poet.

He graduated from University of Michigan, and Brandeis University.
He taught at Brandeis University, Northeastern University, and Stonehill College.

His work has appeared in Agenda, Commonweal, Raritan, The Sewanee Review, The Hudson Review, PN Review, The Antioch Review, Measure, The Formalist, The Cumberland Poetry Review, Tennessee Quarterly, Classical Outlook, Pivot, Rattapallax, and The Weekly Standard.
He has read his work at the Newburyport Literary Festival and other sites throughout New England.
He is a former member of the Powow River Poets.

He was also a contestant on Jeopardy! in 1995, winning $43,399 in four games and giving himself a berth in that year's Tournament of Champions.

Krisak also won the Gold Pocket.com National Trivia Competition.

Works
 Midland (Somers Rocks Press, 1999)
 Fugitive Child (Aralia Press, 1999)
 Even as We Speak (University of Evansville Press, 2000)
 If Anything (WordTech Editions, 2004)
 Afterimage (Measure Press, 2014)

As translator
 The Odes of Horace (Carcanet, 2006)
Virgil's Eclogues (University of Pennsylvania Press, 2010)
Rainer Maria Rilke: New Poems (Boydell & Brewer, 2015)
Ovid's Erotic Poems: Amores and Ars Amatoria (University of Pennsylvania Press, 2014)
Virgil: Aeneid (Focus Classical Library, 2020)

Anthologies
"Tantalus III", Gods and mortals: modern poems on classical myths, Editor Nina Kossman, Oxford University Press, 2001,

Awards and honors 
 2000 Richard Wilbur Award
 Robert Penn Warren Prize
 Robert Frost Prize
 2009 Der-Hovanessian Translation Award, New England Poetry Club 
 Los Angeles Poetry Festival
 Pinch Prize

References

American male poets
University of Michigan alumni
Brandeis University alumni
Brandeis University faculty
Living people
Northeastern University faculty
Translators of Virgil
1948 births
Jeopardy! contestants